Babar: The Movie is a 1989 animated adventure film based on the characters of Jean de Brunhoff's eponymous children's books. It serves as the season finale to the first season of the TV series, as the second season started airing shortly after.

The film is produced by Canada's Nelvana Limited and France's Ellipse Programmé and distributed by Astral Films in Canada and New Line Cinema in the United States.

Plot
On the night of Elephantland's Victory Parade, Babar tells his four children the story of his first days as King of the elephants.

On his first day as king, he is asked to choose a name for Elephantland's Annual Parade. Babar promptly selects one, but is informed by Cornelius and Pompadour that the matter must be thoroughly examined by committee. Babar's cousin, Celeste, then interrupts to tell Babar that her home has been attacked by Rataxes, the rhinoceros lord, and his horde. The chancellors scoff and rebuff her, but Babar, partly to impress Celeste and a strong ruling ethic, orders an elephant army to be called up immediately to defeat the rhinos.

However, due to slow procedures and the cautiousness of his advisors, Babar learns that the muster will take at least three days. Not willing to wait any longer and feeling like he's not keeping his promise to Celeste, Babar tells his cousin Arthur to take care of his job as King while he ventures off on his own into a dangerous jungle. He finds Celeste's village on fire; the rhinos are taking the adult elephants as slaves so that they can work on building a rhino city. Babar tries to intervene, but is attacked, and Celeste is thrown down the town well.

When he regains consciousness by the next morning, Babar rescues Celeste out of the well, and they set off to rescue her mother, and the other pachyderms, from Rataxes' wrath. Along the way, they meet a monkey named Zephir, who gives them the location of Rataxes' lair. Babar and Celeste encounter Rataxes, who plans to invade Babar's kingdom by twilight. After an intense chase through the rhinos' hideout, Babar and Celeste are imprisoned. They both escape along with Zephir, and head back to Elephantland, where they find Rataxes' army camping outside the city.

Sneaking into the rhinos' camp, they disguise themselves as one of the warriors, asking for "special detail" of their plans for attack, but are eventually discovered. They manage to escape on a catapult, landing in a fountain, much to the surprise of Babar's advisors.

Rataxes prepares to launch his attack and proclaims Elephantland will be destroyed in an hour. To buy time, Babar orders Cornelius and Pompadour to distract Rataxes with their "committee" procedure. The elephants, along with Babar, build a giant elephant float, which scares off Rataxes and his soldiers.

At sunrise, Babar's friends congratulate him on saving the day and his town, but are surprised to learn that their very first Victory Parade will be held during the afternoon. It has gone by that name ever since, the older Babar recalls, because the committee could not find any other name for it.

As Babar finishes his tale, he finds that his children have all gone to sleep. His children, once he closes the door, re-enact scenes from the story, until he tells them to go to sleep.

Cast

Release
In May 1989, the Toronto-based animation studio Nelvana announced that Babar: The Movie would debut in over 800 U.S. theatres by 28 July of that year. The film, however, opened at only 510 North American venues and grossed US$1,305,187; the Chicago Tribune deemed it a box-office flop, although the film did regain its losses through the home video release. Although a flop in the US and Canada, it was one of the top five grossing films in English Canada for the year with a gross of C$500,000. It was the last animated feature production by Nelvana until 1997's Pippi Longstocking, and another Babar film in 1999, Babar: King of the Elephants. It was released on DVD in 2004 by Artisan Entertainment, before the company was acquired by Lionsgate. Sometime afterwards, Lionsgate's rights to distribution of Nelvana's Babar library expired, and Entertainment One took over distribution rights and reissued the film on DVD in 2013.

A book adaptation of the movie, written by Cathy East Dubowski and illustrated by Renzo Barto, was published by Random House in November 1989.

Soundtrack
The film features five main songs, performed by Molly Johnson, Judy Tate, The Nylons, and by cast members Stephen Ouimette, Chris Wiggins, and John Stocker.

The songs are (in order of appearance):

 "Elephantland March" - written by Maribeth Solomon; performed by The Nylons, Judy Tate, Debbie Fleming (as Debbie Flemming), John Rutledge, and Neil Donell.
 "The Committee Song" - written by Philip Balsam (credited as Phil Balsam); performed by Stephen Ouimette, Chris Wiggins, and The Nylons.
 "The Best We Both Can Be" - written by Maribeth Solomon; performed by Molly Johnson.
 "Monkey Business" - written by Maribeth Solomon; performed by John Stocker, Judy Tate, Debbie Fleming (as Debbie Flemming), John Rutledge, Neil Donell, and The Nylons.
 "Rataxes' Song" - written by Kevan Staples, Marvin Dolgay, and Carole Pope; performed by Charles Kerr.

Reception
The film received mixed reviews from critics.

References

External links

 
 
 
 
 Babar: The Movie at Keyframe: The Animation Resource

1989 films
1989 animated films
1989 fantasy films
1989 independent films
1980s French animated films
Canadian animated feature films
Canadian animated fantasy films
Canadian independent films
Canadian children's animated films
Canadian fantasy adventure films
French children's films
French animated films
French animated fantasy films
French fantasy adventure films
French independent films
Animated films about elephants
Animated films about monkeys
Films about rhinoceroses
Animated films based on children's books
Films based on French novels
Animated films based on animated series
Films set in Africa
Nelvana films
New Line Cinema films
New Line Cinema animated films
1980s English-language films
1980s French-language films
Babar the Elephant
1980s children's animated films
1980s American films
1980s Canadian films